Udagama is a village in Sri Lanka. Udagama may also refer to the following Sri Lankan places or people

Villages
Ankumbura Udagama
Haputale Udagama
Tembiligala Udagama
Udagama, Eastern Province
Udagama Pallegama
Uduwela Udagama
Vilana Udagama

Other
Deepika Udagama, Sri Lankan lawyer 
Udagama Kanda, a mountain